Capital punishment is a legal penalty in the U.S. state of Louisiana.

Despite remaining a legal penalty, there have been no executions in Louisiana since 2010, and no involuntary executions since 2002. Execution protocols are tied up in litigation due to a 2012 lawsuit challenging Louisiana's lethal injection procedures. In addition, certain pharmaceutical companies and manufacturers do not want their products associated with capital punishment, meaning the state has been unable to obtain lethal injection drugs. Despite this, a 2018 survey by the Louisiana State University found that the majority of Louisianan citizens still support capital punishment. The most recent execution was of Gerald Bordelon, who waived his appeals and asked to be executed in 2010. He is the only person to have been executed in Louisiana since 2002.

Legal process
When the prosecution seeks the death penalty, the sentence is decided by the jury.

In case of a hung jury during the penalty phase of the trial, a life sentence is issued, even if a single juror opposed death (there is no retrial).

The governor may commute death sentences with advice and consent of the Louisiana Board of Pardons and Parole. The governor doesn't need such consent for issuing a mere stay of execution.

The male death row is at the Louisiana State Penitentiary in West Feliciana Parish. The female death row is at Louisiana Correctional Institute for Women in St. Gabriel.

Executions in Louisiana are currently performed at the Louisiana State Penitentiary. Louisiana's method of execution is lethal injection.

Capital crimes
First degree murder is punishable by death when it involves any of the following aggravating factors:
The offender was engaged in the perpetration or attempted perpetration of aggravated or first degree rape, forcible or second degree rape, aggravated kidnapping, second degree kidnapping, aggravated burglary, aggravated arson, aggravated escape, assault by drive-by shooting, armed robbery, first degree robbery, second degree robbery, simple robbery, cruelty to juveniles, second degree cruelty to juveniles, or terrorism.
The victim was a fireman or peace officer engaged in his lawful duties.
The offender has been previously convicted of an unrelated murder, aggravated or first degree rape, aggravated burglary, aggravated arson, aggravated escape, armed robbery, or aggravated kidnapping.
The offender knowingly created a risk of death or great bodily harm to more than one person.
The offender offered or has been offered or has given or received anything of value for the commission of the offense.
The offender at the time of the commission of the offense was imprisoned after sentence for the commission of an unrelated forcible felony.
The offense was committed in an especially heinous, atrocious or cruel manner.
The victim was a witness in a prosecution against the defendant, gave material assistance to the state in any investigation or prosecution of the defendant, or was an eye witness to a crime alleged to have been committed by the defendant or possessed other material evidence against the defendant.
The victim was a correctional officer or any employee of the Department of Public Safety and Corrections who, in the normal course of his employment was required to come in close contact with persons incarcerated in a state prison facility, and the victim was engaged in his lawful duties at the time of the offense.
The victim was under the age of 12 years or 65 years of age or older.
The offender was engaged in the distribution, exchange, sale, or purchase, or any attempt thereof, of a controlled dangerous substance .
The offender was engaged in ritualistic acts.
The offender has knowingly killed two or more persons in a series of separate incidents.

Treason is also a capital crime in Louisiana. Formerly the state also allowed execution for the aggravated rape of a victim under the age of 12. The Supreme Court, however, ruled it unconstitutional on June 25, 2008 in Kennedy v. Louisiana, saying "there is a distinction between intentional first-degree murder on the one hand and nonhomicide crimes against individual persons".

Notable cases

On August 29, 2009—the fourth anniversary of Hurricane Katrina—a jury in Orleans Parish sentenced Michael Anderson to death on each of five counts of first degree murder for his execution style shooting of five teenagers on June 17, 2006. The quintuple slaying, which occurred as the nation watched New Orleans begin to rebuild in the aftermath of the storm, drew national attention to the violent crime problems plaguing the city and prompted then-Governor Kathleen Blanco to call in the Louisiana National Guard to help the New Orleans Police Department patrol the streets of the city.  The sentence was especially significant as it marked the first time in twelve years that an Orleans Parish jury had sent a person to the state's death row at the Louisiana State Penitentiary in Angola, Louisiana.

The prosecution of Rodricus Crawford for the murder of his one-year-old son in 2013 brought national attention to Caddo Parish, Louisiana and its controversial District Attorney (DA) Dale Cox, responsible for one-third of the entire state of Louisiana's death sentences since he became DA and a strong proponent of the death penalty. Crawford was later exonerated.

See also

List of people executed in Louisiana
List of death row inmates in Louisiana
Crime in Louisiana
Law of Louisiana

References

External links
 Louisiana State Penitentiary
 RS 14:30 "First Degree Murder"
 RS 14:42"Aggravated Rape"
 RS 14:113 "Treason"
 Louisiana and the Death Penalty - CourtTV

 
Executions
Louisiana
Louisiana law